Sirikonda is a village in the Nizamabad district of Telangana, India.

References 

Villages in Nizamabad district